Samee is a Thai television series produced by Maker J, remake of the 2000 Thai television series of the same name. It aired on Channel 3 from November 21, 2013 to January 9, 2014, on Wednesdays and Thursdays for 14 episodes. It was also re-released on Channel 3 official YouTube account as 25 episodes.

Plot 
Proud girl Rasika isn't happy to learn that her mother is going to marry Jao Sua, a Chinese-Thai business man she believes responsible for the death of her father, to save their home from seizure due to debts. The girl's uncle Prasit, however, wants the money straight from Rasika and is willing to kill her to acquire the palace, so Jao Sua is forced to marry her to his son Rab.

Characters 
Warintorn Panhakarn as Rab Limwatanatawornkul
Preem Ranida Techasit as M.R. Rasika Prakakiat "Khunying Ai"
Ice Apissada Kreurkongka as Surisong Prakardkiatsak, Prasit's daughter
Mint Nutwara Vongvasana as Ronglai Limwatanatawornkul, Rab's sister
Thanakrit Panichwid as Pattawee Prakardkiatsak "Wee", Rasika's friend
Alex Rendell as Ram Limwatanatawornkul, Rab's younger brother
Primorata Dejudom as Sirisopa, Rab's ex-girlfriend
Orn Patteera Sarutipongpokin as Rarin Lin Watanatawornkul
Jieb Pijitra as Rong Limwatanatawakorn
Namfon Sruangsuda Lawanprasert as Linda, Ram's mother
Jariya Anfone as Mom Rattanawalee "Walee", Rasika's mother
Dilok Thong wattana as Reaw Limwatanatawornkul "Jao Sua", Rab's father
Ton Jakkrit Ammarat as Prasit Prakardkiatsak, Rasika's uncle

Original soundtrack

References

External links 
  

2013 Thai television series debuts
2014 Thai television series endings
2010s Thai television series
Serial drama television series
Television shows based on novels
Television shows set in Thailand
Channel 3 (Thailand) original programming